STS Lord Nelson was a sail training ship operated by the Jubilee Sailing Trust. She was designed by Colin Mudie and launched on 17 October 1986.

The ship was built by the Jubilee Sailing Trust (JST) and, along with the SV Tenacious, the pair were the only tall ships in the world that are wheelchair accessible throughout. The JST are an international UN accredited charity offering sailing adventures to people of all abilities and backgrounds. She was decommissioned in October 2019. On the 26 April 2021 the Jubilee Sailing Trust announced  a plan to  sell the vessel.

History

Build 
STS Lord Nelson was commissioned by the Jubilee Sailing Trust, and the build was started in the summer of 1984 at the yard of James W Cook, Wivenhoe, Essex. She was designed by Colin Mudie, and is his design no 342. The ship was launched almost a year after the formal keel laying.

After J W Cook went into voluntary liquidation, Lord Nelson was moved to Vosper Thornycroft’s yard in Woolston, Southampton. As a result of an industrial dispute at Vospers, Lord Nelson had to move again, this time to Coles Yard in Cowes where the remainder of the work was carried out. She was finally sailed in completed form from Southampton on 17 October 1986.

She finished her final voyage on 10 October 2019 to Southampton, and was subsequently moved to Bristol docks for decommissioning.

History in service 

STS Lord Nelson completed 16,000 accessible voyages during her 33 years at sea with the Jubilee Sailing Trust

Further reading 

 
 
 
 Report on the investigation of Lord Nelson contact with Tower Bridge London River Thames 15 May 2004 assets.publishing.service.gov.uk, Retrieved 2018-12-07
 Harry Turner: World's first round-the-world ship crewed by disabled docks in London yachtsandyachting.com, 24 Sep 2014, Retrieved 2018-12-07

References 

1986 ships
Accessible transportation
Disabled boating
Tall ships of the United Kingdom
Individual sailing vessels
Barques
Sail training ships